The 1985 Kansas City Royals season was the 17th season in Royals franchise history. It ended with the Royals' first World Series championship over their inter-state rivals, the St. Louis Cardinals.  The Royals won the Western Division of the American League for the second consecutive season and the sixth time in ten years.  The team improved its record to 91–71 on the strength of its pitching, led by Bret Saberhagen's Cy Young Award-winning performance.

In the postseason, the Royals went on to win the American League Championship Series for just the second time and the World Series for the first time (they previously lost the 1980 World Series).  Both the ALCS and the World Series were won in seven games after the Royals lost the first two games at home and three of the first four games overall. The championship series against the Cardinals was forever remembered in St. Louis by umpires' supposedly blown calls in Game Six: one that cost the Royals a run in the 4th, and a blown call by umpire Don Denkinger that allowed Jorge Orta to reach first.  The World Series is remembered in Kansas City as the culmination of ten years of dominance by the Royals, during which they reached the playoffs seven times, with stars such as George Brett, Hal McRae and Willie Wilson.

The team was managed by Dick Howser in his fourth and final full season with the Royals.

The Royals did not return to the postseason until 2014 and won the World Series again in 2015.

Offseason
 January 18, 1985: Danny Darwin was traded as part of a 4-team trade by the Texas Rangers with a player to be named later to the Milwaukee Brewers. The Milwaukee Brewers sent Jim Sundberg to the Kansas City Royals. The New York Mets sent Tim Leary to the Milwaukee Brewers. The Kansas City Royals sent Don Slaught to the Texas Rangers. The Kansas City Royals sent Frank Wills to the New York Mets. The Texas Rangers sent Bill Nance (minors) (January 30, 1985) to the Milwaukee Brewers to complete the trade.
 February 25, 1985: Jamie Quirk was signed as a free agent with the Kansas City Royals.

Offense

Pitching

Regular season
The Royals opened the season at home on Monday, April 8, in a three-game series versus the Toronto Blue Jays. In his second straight opening day start, Bud Black faced off against the Blue Jays' Dave Stieb and allowed only a single earned run on four hits as the Royals won, 2–1.  Stieb held the Royals scoreless for 6 innings before giving up the game-winning runs on a double by Willie Wilson.  Black exited the game in the eighth inning with two outs after giving up a single and a walk.  Dan Quisenberry closed out the game for his first save of the new season.  The attendance of 41,086 was the highest of any home opener and wasn't exceeded until the 2005 season.  It was also the second highest of any of the Royals' regular season home games in 1985.

The Seattle Mariners had the strongest start in the division—winning their first six games at home by sweeping the Oakland Athletics and Minnesota Twins.  But the Mariners quickly faded into sixth place as they lost twelve of their next thirteen games.  After their losses in Seattle, the Athletics returned home to win seven of their next nine games, and on April 21 were in a three-way tie for first with the Mariners and the California Angels.  However, a seven-game losing streak at the end of April pushed them down into sixth place on May 1 and five games below the Angels.  At the end of April the Royals had a record of 11–8 (.579), but they had fallen two games behind the Angels who had finished the month with a six-game winning streak and had a 14–7 record.

The Royals began the month of May by losing seven of their first eight games, culminating in an 11–3 loss on May 11 at home to the New York Yankees.  The team was three games below .500, in fourth place and 5 games behind the Angels.  Three days and three wins later, with a record of 15–15, the Royals would not drop below .500 at any time during the remainder of the season.  (But they would have a .500 record as late as July 12 when they were 42–42.)  With two six-game winning streaks, the team won thirteen of their next seventeen games to enter a first-place tie with the Angels on May 29, with a record of 25–19. This stretch of games was highlighted by three complete-game shutouts pitched by Bret Saberhagen, Bud Black, and Charlie Leibrandt in which they allowed only a combined 8 hits and 4 walks.  And despite being on the road, from May 15 through May 17, the three starters each threw a complete game and allowed a combined two earned runs (a 0.67 ERA), 14 hits, and just one walk.

The Royals struggled to make headway in the divisional race through June and into late July.  Between May 30 and July 21 they were 21–25 and fell to 7 games behind the Angels.  With New York arriving in Kansas City to start a six-game home series on Monday, July 22, the Royals began a seven-game winning streak which was the longest in the season to that point.  Dan Quisenberry picked up his 19th, 20th, and 21st saves as the Royals swept the Yankees, and he put in relief appearances in three of the next four games—picking up two more saves.  On July 29, the Angels' lead had shrunk to 2 games.  They would remain there through September 1 as the Royals were 16–14 during that period and the Angels were 17–15.

The eight-game winning streak (all at home) between September 2 and 8 was the longest of the season for the Royals.  The streak included three games in extra innings.  After winning five of their next seven games, the Royals achieved a 2-game lead over the Angels on September 15.  However, the Mariners, who had given them trouble earlier in the year—winning five of their six previous contests—shut out the Royals twice in a four-game sweep in Kansas City, dropping the Royals into a tie for first place on September 19.  Winning four of their next nine games, the Royals dropped a game behind the Angels on September 29.

After being swept at home in three games by the Twins and with only seven games remaining in the regular season, the Royals faced a four-game series at home versus the Angels.  On September 30 the Royals won the first game 3–1 with Saberhagen pitching a complete game and giving up just one run on a home run by Doug DeCinces.  Saberhagen collected ten strikeouts in the game and allowed only seven batters to reach first base.  The Angels claimed the following game on October 1 by the score of 4–2 with Mike Witt pitching.  The Royals won the third game on October 2 with Black pitching a complete-game shutout and allowing only five batters to reach first base.  Three of the four runs scored by the Royals came in the bottom of the first inning with no outs as George Brett hit an inside-the-park home run to center field with two runners on base.  The final game of the series on October 3 was won, 4–1, by the Royals with Quisenberry recording the final out of the game and his 36th save of the season.  Starting pitcher Danny Jackson had given up just one run in 8 innings despite allowing 11 hits.  The Royals' runs came on three home runs by Frank White, Steve Balboni, and Brett.  With the win, the Royals had a one-game lead on the Angels.

The Royals hosted the Athletics for the final three games of the season while the Angels traveled to Arlington Stadium to battle the Rangers.  On October 4, the Royals defeated the Athletics by the score of 4–2, and the Angels were shut out, 6–0, by the Rangers' starting pitcher Dave Schmidt.  This gave the Royals a two-game lead and assured them of at least a tie for first.  The division championship was claimed in a dramatic fashion on the following day as the Royals come from behind to defeat the Athletics in ten innings by the score of 5–4.  The final game of the season on October 6 was a loss, and the Royals finished the season with a record of 91–71 (.562).

Season standings

Record vs. opponents

Notable transactions
 June 3, 1985: Brian McRae was drafted by the Kansas City Royals in the 1st round (17th pick) of the 1985 amateur draft. Player signed June 10, 1985.
 June 3, 1985: Chris Jelic was drafted by the Kansas City Royals in the 2nd round of the 1985 amateur draft.
 June 3, 1985: Deion Sanders was drafted by the Kansas City Royals in the 6th round of the 1985 amateur draft, but did not sign.

Opening Day Lineup

Roster

All-Stars
 Dick Howser, Manager
 George Brett, 3B

Game log

Regular season

|-style=background:#bfb
| 1 || April 8 || 1:35p.m. CST || Blue Jays || W 2–1 || Black (1–0) || Stieb (0–1) || Quisenberry (1) || 2:30 || 41,086 || 1–0 || W1
|-style=background:#fbb
| 2 || April 10 || 7:35p.m. CST || Blue Jays || L 0–1  || Caudill (1–0) || Beckwith (0–1) || Lavelle (1) || 2:52 || 14,740 || 1–1 || L1
|-style=background:#fbb
| 3 || April 11 || 7:35p.m. CST || Blue Jays || L 3–4  || Caudill (2–0) || Quisenberry (0–1) || Acker (1) || 3:14 || 17,798 || 1–2 || L2
|-style=background:#fbb
| 4 || April 13 || 12:20p.m. CST || Tigers || L 1–3 || Morris (2–0) || Black (1–1) || – || 2:35 || 21,823 || 1–3 || L3
|-style=background:#fbb
| 5 || April 14 || 1:35p.m. CST || Tigers || L 1–5 || Petry (2–0) || Saberhagen (0–1) || Hernández (2) || 2:31 || 24,447 || 1–4 || L4
|-style=background:#bfb
| 6 || April 16 || 7:35p.m. CST || Red Sox || W 2–0 || Jackson (1–0) || Clemens (1–1) || – || 2:09 || 16,886 || 2–4 || W1
|-style=background:#bfb
| 7 || April 17 || 7:35p.m. CST || Red Sox || W 6–1 || Leibrandt (1–0) || Nipper (0–1) || – || 2:38 || 18,685 || 3–4 || W2
|-style=background:#fbb
| 8 || April 18 || 7:35p.m. CST || Red Sox || L 3–4  || Ojeda (1–0) || Jones (0–1) || – || 4:11 || 22,587 || 3–5 || L1
|-style=background:#bfb
| 9 || April 19 || 6:35p.m. CST || @ Tigers || W 9–2 || Saberhagen (1–1) || Petry (2–1) || – || 2:35 || 35,432 || 4–5 || W1
|-style=background:#fbb
| 10 || April 20 || 12:15p.m. CST || @ Tigers || L 3–4 || Hernández (2–0) || Quisenberry (0–2) || – || 2:30 || 27,339 || 4–6 || L1
|-style=background:#bfb
| 11 || April 21 || 12:30p.m. CST || @ Tigers || W 3–2  || Quisenberry (1–2) || Berenguer (0–1) || Gura (1) || 4:05 || 30,168 || 5–6 || W1
|-style=background:#bfb
| 12 || April 22 || 6:35p.m. CST || @ Blue Jays || W 2–0 || Leibrandt (2–0) || Stieb (1–2) || – || 2:13 || 20,281 || 6–6 || W2
|-style=background:#bfb
| 13 || April 23 || 6:35p.m. CST || @ Blue Jays || W 7–6 || Beckwith (1–1) || Caudill (3–2) || Quisenberry (2) || 2:46 || 18,491 || 7–6 || W3
|-style=background:#fbb
| 14 || April 24 || 12:35p.m. CST || @ Blue Jays || L 2–10 || Leal (1–1) || Saberhagen (1–2) || – || 2:17 || 18,006 || 7–7 || L1
|-style=background:#fbb
| 15 || April 26 || 6:35p.m. CST || @ Red Sox || L 2–5 || Clemens (2–2) || Gubicza (0–1) || – || 2:40 || 26,647 || 7–8 || L2
|-style=background:#bfb
| 16 || April 27 || 12:20p.m. CST || @ Red Sox || W 5–4 || Quisenberry (2–2) || Stanley (0–2) || – || 3:03 || 24,430 || 8–8 || W1
|-style=background:#bfb
| 17 || April 28 || 1:05p.m. CDT || @ Red Sox || W 5–2 || Leibrandt (3–0) || Boyd (2–1) || Beckwith (1) || 2:43 || 23,882 || 9–8 || W2
|-style=background:#bfb
| 18 || April 29 || 7:35p.m. CDT || Indians || W 3–2 || Black (2–1) || Heaton (1–1) || Quisenberry (3) || 2:36 || 19,295 || 10–8 || W3
|-style=background:#bfb
| 19 || April 30 || 7:35p.m. CDT || Indians || W 5–1 || Saberhagen (2–2) || Roan (0–4) || – || 2:27 || 16,282 || 11–8 || W4
|-

|-style=background:#fbb
| 20 || May 1 || 7:35p.m. CDT || Indians || L 5–6 || Schulze (3–0) || Gubicza (0–2) || Waddell (5) || 3:23 || 16,699 || 11–9 || L1
|-style=background:#fbb
| 21 || May 3 || 7:00p.m. CDT || @ Yankees || L 1–7 || Rasmussen (1–1) || Jackson (1–1) || – || 2:36 || 20,603 || 11–10 || L2
|-style=background:#fbb
| 22 || May 4 || 1:00p.m. CDT || @ Yankees || L 2–5 || Guidry (2–3) || Leibrandt (3–1) || – || 2:14 || 22,532 || 11–11 || L3
|-style=background:#fbb
| 23 || May 5 || 1:00p.m. CDT || @ Yankees || L 2–6 || Niekro (4–2) || Black (2–2) || Righetti (7) || 2:33 || 50,209 || 11–12 || L4
|-style=background:#fbb
| 24 || May 7 || 7:35p.m. CDT || Orioles || L 2–4 || Dixon (3–0) || Saberhagen (2–3) || Stewart (5) || 2:14 || 21,664 || 11–13 || L5
|-style=background:#bfb
| 25 || May 8 || 7:35p.m. CDT || Orioles || W 9–8 || LaCoss (1–0) || McGregor (1–3) || – || 2:54 || 19,793 || 12–13 || W1
|-style=background:#fbb
| 26 || May 10 || 7:35p.m. CDT || Yankees || L 4–6 || Guidry (3–3) || Leibrandt (3–2) || Righetti (8) || 2:48 || 34,000 || 12–14 || L1
|-style=background:#fbb
| 27 || May 11 || 3:05p.m. CDT || Yankees || L 3–11 || Rasmussen (2–1) || Black (2–3) || – || 2:35 || 38,011 || 12–15 || L2
|-style=background:#bfb
| 28 || May 12 || 1:35p.m. CDT || Yankees || W 6–5 || Quisenberry (3–2) || Righetti (1–2) || – || 3:04 || 31,009 || 13–15 || W1
|-style=background:#bfb
| 29 || May 13 || 6:35p.m. CDT || @ Orioles || W 5–2 || Jackson (2–1) || Davis (1–1) || Quisenberry (4) || 2:41 || 24,611 || 14–15 || W2
|-style=background:#bfb
| 30 || May 14 || 6:35p.m. CDT || @ Orioles || W 5–3 || Gubicza (1–2) || McGregor (1–4) || Quisenberry (5) || 2:32 || 22,202 || 15–15 || W3
|-style=background:#bfb
| 31 || May 15 || 6:35p.m. CDT || @ Indians || W 5–1 || Leibrandt (4–2) || Schulze (3–3) || – || 2:35 || 4,169 || 16–15 || W4
|-style=background:#bfb
| 32 || May 16 || 6:35p.m. CDT || @ Indians || W 7–1 || Black (3–3) || Creel (0–1) || – || 2:25 || 3,051 || 17–15 || W5
|-style=background:#bfb
| 33 || May 17 || 7:35p.m. CDT || @ Brewers || W 3–0 || Saberhagen (3–3) || Darwin (3–3) || – || 2:14 || 10,587 || 18–15 || W6
|-style=background:#fbb
| 34 || May 18 || 1:35p.m. CDT || @ Brewers || L 2–7 || Haas (4–2) || Jackson (2–2) || – || 2:28 || 20,334 || 18–16 || L1
|-style=background:#fbb
| 35 || May 19 || 1:35p.m. CDT || @ Brewers || L 10–11 || Gibson (4–1) || Quisenberry (3–3) || – || 3:37 || 43,256 || 18–17 || L2
|-style=background:#fbb
| 36 || May 20 || 7:35p.m. CDT || @ Rangers || L 7–8 || Schmidt (2–2) || Beckwith (1–2) || – || 2:49 || 18,945 || 18–18 || L3
|-style=background:#bfb
| 37 || May 21 || 7:35p.m. CDT || @ Rangers || W 5–0 || Black (4–3) || Tanana (0–5) || – || 2:07 || 14,018 || 19–18 || W1
|-style=background:#bfb
| 38 || May 22 || 7:35p.m. CDT || @ Rangers || W 6–3 || Saberhagen (4–3) || Noles (2–5) || Quisenberry (6) || 2:28 || 15,447 || 20–18 || W2
|-style=background:#bfb
| 39 || May 24 || 7:35p.m. CDT || White Sox || W 8–4 || Jackson (3–2) || Burns (5–4) || Quisenberry (7) || 3:01 || 32,599 || 21–18 || W3
|-style=background:#bfb
| 40 || May 25 || 12:20p.m. CDT || White Sox || W 3–0 || Leibrandt (5–2) || Seaver (4–3) || – || 2:01 || 25,920 || 22–18 || W4
|-style=background:#bfb
| 41 || May 26 || 1:35p.m. CDT || White Sox || W 3–2 || Black (5–3) || James (1–2) || Quisenberry (8) || 2:33 || 32,563 || 23–18 || W5
|-style=background:#bfb
| 42 || May 27 || 7:35p.m. CDT || Rangers || W 4–2 || Saberhagen (5–3) || Noles (2–6) || Quisenberry (9) || 2:19 || 30,803 || 24–18 || W6
|-style=background:#fbb
| 43 || May 28 || 7:35p.m. CDT || Rangers || L 1–6 || Hooton (2–1) || Gubicza (1–3) || – || 2:39 || 19,160 || 24–19 || L1
|-style=background:#bfb
| 44 || May 29 || 7:35p.m. CDT || Rangers || W 6–2 || Jackson (4–2) || Hough (4–4) || Quisenberry (10) || 2:17 || 20,692 || 25–19 || W1
|-style=background:#fbb
| 45 || May 30 || 7:30p.m. CDT || @ White Sox || L 3–4 || Seaver (5–3) || Leibrandt (5–3) || James (9) || 2:40 || 16,041 || 25–20 || L1
|-style=background:#fbb
| 46 || May 31 || 7:30p.m. CDT || @ White Sox || L 3–8 || Bannister (3–4) || Black (5–4) || Nelson (1) || 2:39 || 25,493 || 25–21 || L2
|-

|-style=background:#fbb
| 47 || June 1 || 6:00p.m. CDT || @ White Sox || L 7–8 || James (2–2) || Jones (0–2) || – || 3:19 || 32,398 || 25–22 || L3
|-style=background:#fbb
| 48 || June 2 || 1:30p.m. CDT || @ White Sox || L 1–4 || Dotson (3–3) || Gubicza (1–4) || James (10) || 2:33 || 23,153 || 25–23 || L4
|-style=background:#bbb
| — || June 3 || || Brewers || colspan=8 | Postponed (Rain) (Makeup date: September 5)
|-style=background:#bfb
| 49 || June 4 || 7:35p.m. CDT || Brewers || W 4–3 || Leibrandt (6–3) || Vuckovich (1–3) || LaCoss (1) || 2:26 || 18,788 || 26–23 || W1
|-style=background:#fbb
| 50 || June 5 || 7:35p.m. CDT || Brewers || L 2–10 || Higuera (4–3) || Black (5–5) || – || 2:25 || 18,666 || 26–24 || L1
|-style=background:#bfb
| 51 || June 7 || 9:30p.m. CDT || @ Angels || W 6–0 || Saberhagen (6–3) || Witt (3–6) || – || 2:26 || 29,414 || 27–24 || W1
|-style=background:#bfb
| 52 || June 8 || 9:00p.m. CDT || @ Angels || W 4–1 || Gubicza (2–4) || Slaton (4–4) || Quisenberry (11) || 2:19 || 46,393 || 28–24 || W2
|-style=background:#fbb
| 53 || June 9 || 3:00p.m. CDT || @ Angels || L 0–1 || Romanick (7–2) || Jackson (4–3) || Moore (12) || 2:04 || 41,973 || 28–25 || L1
|-style=background:#fbb
| 54 || June 10 || 9:35p.m. CDT || @ Athletics || L 1–2  || Howell (5–3) || Quisenberry (3–4) || – || 3:33 || 16,500 || 28–26 || L2
|-style=background:#fbb
| 55 || June 11 || 9:35p.m. CDT || @ Athletics || L 3–4 || Howell (6–3) || Black (5–6) || – || 2:43 || 7,201 || 28–27 || L3
|-style=background:#bfb
| 56 || June 12 || 2:15p.m. CDT || @ Athletics || W 3–2  || Jones (1–2) || McCatty (2–3) || – || 4:19 || 11,010 || 29–27 || W1
|-style=background:#bfb
| 57 || June 13 || 9:35p.m. CDT || @ Mariners || W 4–3 || Gubicza (3–4) || Wilkinson (0–1) || Quisenberry (12) || 2:41 || 8,691 || 30–27 || W2
|-style=background:#fbb
| 58 || June 14 || 9:35p.m. CDT || @ Mariners || L 5–13 || Wills (2–0) || Jackson (4–4) || — || 3:10 || 10,765 || 30–28 || L1
|-style=background:#fbb
| 59 || June 15 || 9:05p.m. CDT || @ Mariners || L 1–2 || Young (5–8) || Leibrandt (6–4) || Vande Berg (3) || 2:34 || 26,067 || 30–29 || L2
|-style=background:#fbb
| 60 || June 16 || 3:35p.m. CDT || @ Mariners || L 1–2 || Best (2–1) || Beckwith (1–3) || — || 2:34 || 14,103 || 30–30 || L3
|-style=background:#bfb
| 61 || June 17 || 7:35p.m. CDT || Twins || W 10–3 || Saberhagen (7–3) || Viola (7–6) || – || 2:15 || 31,885 || 31–30 || W1
|-style=background:#bfb
| 62 || June 18 || 7:35p.m. CDT || Twins || W 10–3 || Gubicza (4–4) || Smithson (5–6) || – || 2:36 || 21,662 || 32–30 || W2
|-style=background:#bfb
| 63 || June 19 || 7:35p.m. CDT || Twins || W 3–2 || Jackson (5–4) || Filson (3–4) || Quisenberry (13) || 2:17 || 22,033 || 33–30 || W3
|-style=background:#fbb
| 64 || June 20 || 7:35p.m. CDT || Twins || L 8–11 || Eufemia (1–0) || Beckwith (1–4) || Whitehouse (1) || 3:32 || 31,461 || 33–31 || L1
|-style=background:#bbb
| — || June 21 || || Mariners ||colspan="8" | Postponed (Rain) (Makeup date: September 19)
|-style=background:#fbb
| 65 || June 22 || 7:35p.m. CDT || Mariners || L 1–2 || Swift (2–1) || Saberhagen (6–4) || Núñez (7) || 2:35 || 35,959 || 33–32 || L2
|-style=background:#fbb
| 66 || June 23 || 1:35p.m. CDT || Mariners || L 2–8 || Moore (5–4) || Black (5–7) || — || 2:54 || 31,080 || 33–33 || L3
|-style=background:#bfb
| 67 || June 24 || 7:35p.m. CDT || @ Twins || W 12–6 || Gubicza (5–4) || Filson (3–5) || – || 3:08 || 24,035 || 34–33 || W1
|-style=background:#bfb
| 68 || June 25 || 7:35p.m. CDT || @ Twins || W 3–0 || Jackson (6–4) || Butcher (4–7) || – || 2:04 || 31,885 || 35–33 || W2
|-style=background:#fbb
| 69 || June 26 || 7:35p.m. CDT || @ Twins || L 1–2 || Schrom (7–5) || Leibrandt (6–5) || – || 2:14 || 20,060 || 35–34 || L1
|-style=background:#bfb
| 70 || June 28 || 7:35p.m. CDT || Angels || W 5–4  || Quisenberry (4–4) || Corbett (2–1) || – || 4:50 || 32,651 || 36–34 || W1
|-style=background:#fbb
| 71 || June 29 || 7:35p.m. CDT || Angels || L 1–7 || Lugo (3–1) || Black (5–8) || – || 2:46 || 39,451 || 36–35 || L1
|-style=background:#bfb
| 72 || June 30 || 1:35p.m. CDT || Angels || W 3–1 || Gubicza (6–4) || Romanick (8–4) || Quisenberry (14) || 2:23 || 33,173 || 37–35 || W1
|-

|-style=background:#fbb
| 73 || July 1 || 7:35p.m. CDT || Athletics || L 3–4 || Atherton (4–4) || Jackson (6–5) || Howell (17) || 2:59 || 31,781 || 37–36 || L1
|-style=background:#bfb
| 74 || July 2 || 7:35p.m. CDT || Athletics || W 10–1 || Leibrandt (7–5) || Langford (0–2) || – || 2:29 || 19,676 || 38–36 || W1
|-style=background:#bfb
| 75 || July 3 || 7:35p.m. CDT || Athletics || W 3–0 || Saberhagen (8–4) || Codiroli (8–4) || Quisenberry (13) || 2:17 || 22,142 || 39–36 || W2
|-style=background:#fbb
| 76 || July 4 || 7:35p.m. CDT || Orioles || L 3–5 || Martínez (7–5) || Black (5–9) || Snell (4) || 2:26 || 40,616 || 39–37 || L1
|-style=background:#fbb
| 77 || July 5 || 7:35p.m. CDT || Orioles || L 3–6 || Boddicker (9–7) || Gubicza (6–5) || Stewart (6) || 2:42 || 30,488 || 39–38 || L2
|-style=background:#fbb
| 78 || July 6 || 1:20p.m. CDT || Orioles || L 3–8 || McGregor (7–7) || Jackson (6–6) || – || 2:44 || 26,898 || 39–39 || L3
|-style=background:#bfb
| 79 || July 7 || 1:35p.m. CDT || Orioles || W 8–4 || Leibrandt (8–5) || Davis (1–1) || Quisenberry (16) || 2:52 || 24,131 || 40–39 || W1
|-style=background:#bfb
| 80 || July 8 || 7:10p.m. CDT || @ Yankees || W 5–2 || Saberhagen (9–4) || Niekro (7–8) || – || 2:16 || 17,193 || 41–39 || W2
|-style=background:#fbb
| 81 || July 9 || 7:00p.m. CDT || @ Yankees || L 4–6 || Guidry (11–3) || Black (5–10) || Righetti (15) || 3:11 || 24,528 || 41–40 || L1
|-style=background:#fbb
| 82 || July 10 || 12Noon CDT || @ Yankees || L 5–6 || Righetti (7–6) || Quisenberry (4–5) || – || 2:53 || 35,274 || 41–41 || L2
|-style=background:#bfb
| 83 || July 11 || 6:35p.m. CDT || @ Indians || W 1–0 || Jackson (7–6) || Ruhle (2–4) || – || 2:26 || 5,256 || 42–41 || W1
|-style=background:#fbb
| 84 || July 12 || 6:35p.m. CDT || @ Indians || L 4–5  || Waddell (4–5) || Quisenberry (4–6) || – || 3:22 || 8,058 || 42–42 || L1
|-style=background:#bfb
| 85 || July 13 || 6:35p.m. CDT || @ Indians || W 5–1 || Saberhagen (10–4) || Blyleven (8–9) || – || 2:20 || 12,794 || 43–42 || W1
|-style=background:#bfb
| 86 || July 14 || 12:35p.m. CDT || @ Indians || W 9–5 || Black (6–10) || Heaton (5–11) || Quisenberry (17) || 3:14 || 25,466 || 44–42 || W2
|-style=background:#bbbfff
|colspan="12"|56th All-Star Game in Minneapolis, MN
|-style=background:#fbb
| 87 || July 18 || 6:35p.m. CDT || @ Orioles || L 3–8 || McGregor (8–7) || Saberhagen (10–5) || Stewart (7) || 2:53 || 25,579 || 44–43 || L1
|-style=background:#bfb
| 88 || July 19 || 7:05p.m. CDT || @ Orioles || W 10–3 || Leibrandt (9–5) || Boddicker (9–10) || – || 2:45 || 29,410 || 45–43 || W1
|-style=background:#bfb
| 89 || July 20 || 12:20p.m. CDT || @ Orioles || W 7–5 || Jackson (8–6) || Flanagan (0–1) || Quisenberry (18) || 2:40 || 26,366 || 46–43 || W2
|-style=background:#fbb
| 90 || July 21 || 1:05p.m. CDT || @ Orioles || L 4–6 || Martinez (2–2) || Black (6–11) || Aase (4) || 2:51 || 31,278 || 46–44 || L1
|-style=background:#bfb
| 91 || July 22 || 7:10p.m. CDT || Yankees || W 5–4 || Jones (2–2) || Rasmussen (3–5) || Quisenberry (19) || 2:56 || 40,938 || 47–44 || W1
|-style=background:#bfb
| 92 || July 23 || 7:35p.m. CDT || Yankees || W 5–2 || Saberhagen (11–5) || Whitson (5–7) || Quisenberry (20) || 2:40 || 32,450 || 48–44 || W2
|-style=background:#bfb
| 93 || July 24 || 7:35p.m. CDT || Yankees || W 5–3 || Leibrandt (10–5) || Cowley (8–4) || Quisenberry (21) || 2:45 || 31,580 || 49–44 || W3
|-style=background:#bfb
| 94 || July 26 || 7:35p.m. CDT || Indians || W 7–1 || Jackson (9–6) || Romero (0–1) || – || 2:43 || 27,860 || 50–44 || W4
|-style=background:#bfb
| 95 || July 27 || 7:35p.m. CDT || Indians || W 6–3 || Black (7–11) || Reed (0–3) || Quisenberry (22) || 2:23 || 33,473 || 51–44 || W5
|-style=background:#bfb
| 96 || July 28 || 1:35p.m. CDT || Indians || W 7–4 || Gubicza (7–5) || Ruhle (2–7) || Quisenberry (23) || 2:36 || 38,352 || 52–44 || W6
|-style=background:#bfb
| 97 || July 29 || 7:10p.m. CDT || @ Tigers || W 4–2 || Saberhagen (12–5) || Petry (11–10) || – || 2:48 || 36,068 || 53–44 || W7
|-style=background:#fbb
| 98 || July 30 || 6:35p.m. CDT || @ Tigers || L 7–11 || Morris (12–6) || Leibrandt (10–6) || Hernández (21) || 3:27 || 34,261 || 53–45 || L1
|-style=background:#bfb
| 99 || July 31 || 12:30p.m. CDT || @ Tigers || W 5–2 || Jackson (10–6) || Terrell (10–6) || Quisenberry (24) || 2:30 || 34,276 || 54–45 || W1
|-

|-style=background:#bfb
| 100 || August 2 || 7:35p.m. CDT || Red Sox || W 4–3  || Quisenberry (5–6) || Clear (1–2) || – || 3:04 || 37,212 || 55–45 || W2
|-style=background:#fbb
| 101 || August 3 || 7:35p.m. CDT || Red Sox || L 4–5 || Clemens (7–4) || Gubicza (7–6) || Crawford (4) || 3:15 || 40,370 || 55–46 || L1
|-style=background:#fbb
| 102 || August 4 || 1:35p.m. CDT || Red Sox || L 5–6  || Stanley (6–5) || LaCoss (1–1) || Clear (3) || 3:48 || 31,020 || 55–47 || L2
|-style=background:#fbb
| 103 || August 5 || 7:35p.m. CDT || Tigers || L 4–8 || Terrell (11–6) || Jackson (10–7) || Hernández (22) || 2:53 || 41,251 || 55–48 || L3
|-style=background:#bbb
| — || August 6 || || Tigers || colspan=8 | Postponed (Strike) (Makeup date: August 8)
|-style=background:#bbb
| — || August 7 || || Tigers || colspan=8 | Postponed (Strike) (Makeup date: August 19)
|-style=background:#bfb
| 104  || August 8 || 5:05p.m. CDT || Tigers || W 10–3 || Saberhagen (13–5) || Tanana (6–11) || – || 2:39 || – || 56–48 || W1
|-style=background:#bfb
| 105  || August 8 || 8:19p.m. CDT || Tigers || W 6–4 || Gubicza (8–6) || Petry (12–11) || Quisenberry (25) || 3:04 || 35,585 || 57–48 || W2
|-style=background:#bfb
| 106 || August 9 || 7:35p.m. CDT || Blue Jays || W 4–2 || Black (8–11) || Stieb (10–8) || – || 2:21 || 25,868 || 58–48 || W3
|-style=background:#bfb
| 107 || August 10 || 7:35p.m. CDT || Blue Jays || W 4–3  || Quisenberry (6–6) || Caudill (4–5) || – || 2:54 || 34,448 || 59–48 || W4
|-style=background:#fbb
| 108 || August 11 || 1:35p.m. CDT || Blue Jays || L 3–5  || Henke (3–0) || Beckwith (1–5) ||–|| 3:27 || 27,457 || 59–49 || L1
|-style=background:#bfb
| 109 || August 12 || 6:35p.m. CDT || @ Red Sox || W 3–2 || Gubicza (9–6) || Nipper (7–8) || Quisenberry (26) || 2:39 || 22,843 || 60–49 || W1
|-style=background:#bfb
| 110 || August 13 || 6:35p.m. CDT || @ Red Sox || W 6–3 || Saberhagen (14–5) || Ojeda (5–7) || Quisenberry (27) || 3:03 || 23,189 || 61–49 || W2
|-style=background:#fbb
| 111 || August 14 || 6:35p.m. CDT || @ Red Sox || L 3–16 || Hurst (8–9) || Black (8–12) || – || 2:56 || 22,870 || 61–50 || L1
|-style=background:#bfb
| 112 || August 16 || 6:35p.m. CDT || @ Blue Jays || W 4–2 || Leibrandt (11–6) || Key (9–5) || – || 2:31 || 38,269 || 62–50 || W1
|-style=background:#bfb
| 113 || August 17 || 12:20p.m. CDT || @ Blue Jays || W 4–2 || Jackson (11–7) || Alexander (12–7) || Quisenberry (28) || 2:21 || 42,313 || 63–50 || W2
|-style=background:#fbb
| 114 || August 18 || 12:35p.m. CDT || @ Blue Jays || L 6–10 || Gubicza (9–7) || Filer (6–0) || – || 3:02 || 37,458 || 63–51 || L1
|-style=background:#bfb
| 115 || August 19 || 7:35p.m. CDT || Tigers || W 2–1  || Saberhagen (15–5) || Morris (13–7) || – || 2:42 || 20,929 || 64–51 || W1
|-style=background:#fbb
| 116 || August 20 || 7:30p.m. CDT || @ White Sox || L 1–2 || James (5–5) || Quisenberry (6–7) || – || 2:46 || 19,318 || 64–52 || L1
|-style=background:#bfb
| 117 || August 21 || 7:30p.m. CDT || @ White Sox || W 2–1 || Leibrandt (12–6) || Bannister (5–11) || Quisenberry (29) || 2:51 || 16,243 || 65–52 || W1
|-style=background:#bfb
| 118 || August 22 || 7:30p.m. CDT || @ White Sox || W 7–3 || Jackson (12–7) || Davis (1–1) || Quisenberry (30) || 3:05 || 22,505 || 66–52 || W2
|-style=background:#fbb
| 119 || August 23 || 7:35p.m. CDT || Rangers || L 3–4 || Schmidt (5–3) || Quisenberry (6–8) || – || 3:05 || 33,483 || 66–53 || L1
|-style=background:#bfb
| 120 || August 24 || 7:35p.m. CDT || Rangers || W 8–2 || Saberhagen (16–5) || Hooton (5–8) || – || 2:33 || 39,100 || 67–53 || W1
|-style=background:#fbb
| 121 || August 25 || 1:35p.m. CDT || Rangers || L 3–7 || Hough (13–12) || Black (8–13) || – || 3:00 || 28,350 || 67–54 || L1
|-style=background:#bfb
| 122 || August 26 || 7:35p.m. CDT || Rangers || W 9–2 || Leibrandt (13–6) || Russell (1–4) || – || 2:44 || 28,085 || 68–54 || W1
|-style=background:#fbb
| 123 || August 27 || 7:35p.m. CDT || @ Brewers || L 5–8 || Cocanower (4–3) || Jackson (12–8) || Gibson (10) || 2:48 || 8,034 || 68–55 || L1
|-style=background:#bfb
| 124 || August 28 || 7:35p.m. CDT || @ Brewers || W 8–2 || Gubicza (10–7) || Vuckovich (6–10) || – || 2:38 || 7,626 || 69–55 || W1
|-style=background:#bbb
| — || August 29 || || @ Brewers || colspan=8 | Postponed (Rain; Site change) (Makeup date: September 6)
|-style=background:#fbb
| 125 || August 30 || 7:35p.m. CDT || @ Rangers || L 1–4 || Hough (14–12) || Black (8–14) || – || 2:18 || 14,330 || 69–56 || L1
|-style=background:#fbb
| 126 || August 31 || 7:35p.m. CDT || @ Rangers || L 4–6 || Harris (4–3) || Leibrandt (13–7) || – || 2:34 || 14,709 || 69–57 || L2
|-

|-style=background:#fbb
| 127 || September 1 || 6:05p.m. CDT || @ Rangers || L 3–5 || Mason (6–12) || Jackson (12–9) || Henry (1) || 2:04 || 10,587 || 69–58 || L3
|-style=background:#bfb
| 128 || September 2 || 7:35p.m. CDT || White Sox || W 3–2 || Gubicza (1–3) || Nelson (8–9) || Quisenberry (31) || 2:46 || 32,681 || 70–58 || W1
|-style=background:#bfb
| 129 || September 3 || 7:35p.m. CDT || White Sox || W 3–2 || Saberhagen (17–5) || Seaver (12–10) || – || 2:10 || 17,521 || 71–58 || W2
|-style=background:#bfb
| 130 || September 4 || 7:35p.m. CDT || White Sox || W 6–5  || Jones (3–2) || James (6–6) || – || 3:38 || 19,940 || 72–58 || W3
|-style=background:#bfb
| 131 || September 5 || 7:35p.m. CDT || Brewers || W 4–1 || Leibrandt (14–7) || Haas (4–2) || – || 2:14 || 2,527 || 73–58 || W4
|-style=background:#bfb
| 132  || September 6 || 5:05p.m. CDT || Brewers || W 4–3  || Quisenberry (7–8) || Fingers (1–5)|| – || 2:48 || – || 74–58 || W5
|-style=background:#bfb
| 133  || September 6 || 8:28p.m. CDT || Brewers || W 7–1 || Farr (1–0) || Burris (9–11) || – || 2:34 || 26,403 || 75–58 || W6
|-style=background:#bfb
| 134 || September 7 || 7:35p.m. CDT || Brewers || W 7–4 || Gubicza (12–7) || Cocanower (4–5) || Quisenberry (32) || 2:46 || 29,510 || 76–58 || W7
|-style=background:#bfb
| 135 || September 8 || 1:35p.m. CDT || Brewers || W 13–11  || Farr (2–0) || Fingers (1–6) || – || 3:48 || 20,737 || 77–58 || W8
|-style=background:#fbb
| 136 || September 9 || 9:30p.m. CDT || @ Angels || L 1–7 || Candelaria (5–1) || Saberhagen (17–6) || – || 1:57 || 29,688 || 77–59 || L1
|-style=background:#bfb
| 137 || September 10 || 9:30p.m. CDT || @ Angels || W 6–0 || Leibrandt (15–7) || McCaskill (9–11) || – || 2:12 || 37,813 || 78–59 || W1
|-style=background:#bfb
| 138 || September 11 || 9:30p.m. CDT || @ Angels || W 2–1 || Jackson (13–9) || Romanick (13–8) || Quisenberry (33) || 2:41 || 32,906 || 79–59 || W2
|-style=background:#bfb
| 139 || September 13 || 9:35p.m. CDT || @ Athletics || W 5–2 || Gubicza (13–7) || Rijo (3–3) || Quisenberry (34) || 2:45 || 11,253 || 80–59 || W3
|-style=background:#bfb
| 140 || September 14 || 3:05p.m. CDT || @ Athletics || W 2–1 || Saberhagen (18–6) || John (4–8) || – || 2:22 || 30,628 || 81–59 || W4
|-style=background:#fbb
| 141  || September 15 || 2:15p.m. CDT || @ Athletics || L 2–4 || Codiroli (12–12) || Leibrandt (15–8) || Howell (25) || 2:23 || – || 81–60 || L1
|-style=background:#bfb
| 142  || September 15 || 5:13p.m. CDT || @ Athletics || W 7–2 || Black (9–14) || Young (0–3) || – || 2:31 || 15,236 || 82–60 || W1
|-style=background:#fbb
| 143 || September 16 || 7:35p.m. CDT || Mariners || L 1–5 || Moore (15–8) || Jackson (13–10) || — || 2:33 || 21,666 || 82–61 || L1
|-style=background:#fbb
| 144 || September 17 || 7:35p.m. CDT || Mariners || L 0–7 || Young (12–15) || Farr (2–1) || — || 2:36 || 17,770 || 82–62 || L2
|-style=background:#fbb
| 145 || September 18 || 7:35p.m. CDT || Mariners || L 0–6 || Thomas (7–0) || Gubicza (13–8) || — || 2:58 || 16,863 || 82–63 || L3
|-style=background:#fbb
| 146 || September 19 || 7:35p.m. CDT || Mariners || L 4–6 || Núñez (7–2) || Quisenberry (7–9) || Tobik (1) || 3:00 || 7,633 || 82–64 || L4
|-style=background:#bfb
| 147 || September 20 || 7:35p.m. CDT || Twins || W 5–1 || Leibrandt (16–8) || Blyleven (14–16) || – || 2:42 || 22,845 || 83–64 || W1
|-style=background:#bfb
| 148 || September 21 || 7:35p.m. CDT || Twins || W 6–5  || Huismann (1–0) || Davis (2–6) || – || 3:11 || 25,102 || 84–64 || W2
|-style=background:#fbb
| 149 || September 22 || 1:35p.m. CDT || Twins || L 3–7 || Viola (16–14) || Jackson (12–12) || – || 2:31 || 21,277 || 84–65 || L1
|-style=background:#fbb
| 150 || September 24 || 9:35p.m. CDT || @ Mariners || L 2–5 || Moore (16–8) || Gubicza (13–9) || — || 2:26 || 6,433 || 84–66 || L2
|-style=background:#bfb
| 151 || September 25 || 9:35p.m. CDT || @ Mariners || W 5–4 || Saberhagen (19–6) || Young (12–17) || Farr (1) || 2:55 || 6,588 || 85–66 || W1
|-style=background:#bfb
| 152 || September 26 || 9:35p.m. CDT || @ Mariners || W 5–2 || Leibrandt (17–8) || Swift (5–10) || Quisenberry (35) || 2:48 || 6,840 || 86–66 || W2
|-style=background:#fbb
| 153 || September 27 || 7:35p.m. CDT || @ Twins || L 1–4 || Viola (17–14) || Black (9–15) || – || 2:01 || 13,035 || 86–67 || L1
|-style=background:#fbb
| 154 || September 28 || 11:00a.m. CDT || @ Twins || L 3–5 || Dennis Burtt Burtt (2–1) || Jackson (13–12) || Davis (24) || 2:31 || 13,256 || 86–68 || L2
|-style=background:#fbb
| 155 || September 29 || 1:15p.m. CDT || @ Twins || L 3–6 || Butcher (11–14) || Gubicza (13–10) || Davis (25) || 2:43 || 11,292 || 86–69 || L3
|-style=background:#bfb
| 156 || September 30 || 7:35p.m. CDT || Angels || W 3–1 || Saberhagen (20–6) || Candelaria (6–3) || – || 2:09 || 34,200 || 87–69 || W1
|-

|-style=background:#fbb
| 157 || October 1 || 7:35p.m. CDT || Angels || L 2–4 || Witt (14–9) || Leibrandt (17–9) || Moore (30) || 2:36 || 26,273 || 87–70 || L1
|-style=background:#bfb
| 158 || October 2 || 7:35p.m. CDT || Angels || W 4–0 || Black (10–15) || Romanick (14–9) || – || 2:08 || 28,401 || 88–70 || W1
|-style=background:#bfb
| 159 || October 3 || 7:35p.m. CDT || Angels || W 4–1 || Jackson (14–12) || Sutton (15–10) || Quisenberry (36) || 2:24 || 40,894 || 89–70 || W2
|-style=background:#bfb
| 160 || October 4 || 7:35p.m. CDT || Athletics || W 4–2 || Gubicza (14–10) || Rijo (6–4) || Quisenberry (37) || 2:32 || 19,694 || 90–70 || W3
|-style=background:#bfb
| 161 || October 5 || 7:35p.m. CDT || Athletics || W 5–4  || Quisenberry (8–9) || Howell (9–8) || – || 3:23 || 32,949 || 91–70 || W4
|-style=background:#fbb
| 162 || October 6 || 1:35p.m. CDT || Athletics || L 3–9 || Codiroli (14–14) || Jones (3–3) || Mura (1) || 2:36 || 20,935 || 91–71 || L1
|-

|- style="text-align:center;"
| Legend:       = Win       = Loss       = PostponementBold = Royals team member

Postseason Game log

|-style=background:#fbb
| 1 || October 8 || 7:30p.m. CDT || @ Blue Jays || L 1–6 || Stieb (1–0) || Leibrandt (0–1) || – || 2:24 || 39,115 || TOR 1–0 || L1
|-style=background:#fbb
| 2 || October 9 || 2:05p.m. CDT || @ Blue Jays || L 5–6  || Henke (1–0) || Quisenberry (0–1) || – || 3:39 || 34,029 || TOR 2–0 || L2
|-style=background:#cfc
| 3 || October 11 || 7:15p.m. CDT || Blue Jays || W 6–5 || Farr (1–0) || Clancy (0–1) || – || 2:51 || 40,224 || TOR 2–1 || W1
|-style=background:#fbb
| 4 || October 12 || 7:15p.m. CDT || Blue Jays || L 1–3 || Henke (2–0) || Leibrandt (0–2) || – || 3:02 || 41,112 || TOR 3–1 || L1
|-style=background:#cfc
| 5 || October 13 || 3:35p.m. CDT || Blue Jays || W 2–0 || Jackson (1–0) || Key (0–1) || – || 2:21 || 40,046 || TOR 3–2 || W1
|-style=background:#cfc
| 6 || October 15 || 7:15p.m. CDT || @ Blue Jays || W 5–3 || Gubicza (1–0) || Alexander (0–1) || Quisenberry (1) || 3:12 || 37,557 || Tied 3–3 || W2
|-style=background:#cfc
| 7 || October 16 || 7:15p.m. CDT || @ Blue Jays || W 6–2 || Leibrandt (1–2) || Stieb (1–1) || – || 2:49 || 32,084 || KC 4–3 || W3
|-

|-style=background:#fbb
| 1 || October 19 || 7:35p.m. CDT || Cardinals || L 1–3 || Tudor (1–0) || Jackson (0–1) || Worrell (1) || 2:48 || 41,650 || STL 1–0 || L1
|-style=background:#fbb
| 2 || October 20 || 7:30p.m. CDT || Cardinals || L 2–4 || Dayley (1–0) || Leibrandt (0–1) || Lahti (1) || 2:44 || 41,656 || STL 2–0 || L2
|-style=background:#cfc
| 3 || October 22 || 7:35p.m. CDT || @ Cardinals || W 6–1 || Saberhagen (1–0) || Andújar (0–1) || – || 2:59 || 53,634 || STL 2–1 || W1
|-style=background:#fbb
| 4 || October 23 || 7:25p.m. CDT || @ Cardinals || L 0–3 || Tudor (2–0) || Black (0–1) || – || 2:19 || 53,634 || STL 3–1 || L1
|-style=background:#cfc
| 5 || October 24 || 7:25p.m. CDT || @ Cardinals || W 6–1 || Jackson (1–1) || Forsch (0–1) || – || 2:52 || 53,634 || STL 3–2 || W1
|-style=background:#cfc
| 6 || October 26 || 7:25p.m. CDT || Cardinals || W 2–1 || Quisenberry (1–0) || Worrell (0–1) || – || 2:47 || 41,628 || Tied 3–3 || W2
|-style=background:#cfc
| 7 || October 27 || 7:30p.m. CST || Cardinals || W 11–0 || Saberhagen (2–0) || Tudor (2–1) || – || 2:46 || 41,658 || KC 4–3 || W3
|-

|- style="text-align:center;"
| Legend:       = Win       = Loss       = PostponementBold = Royals team member

Postseason

ALCS

Game 1
Tuesday, October 8, 1985, at Exhibition Stadium in Toronto, Ontario

Game 2
Wednesday, October 9, 1985, at Exhibition Stadium in Toronto, Ontario

Game 3
Friday, October 11, 1985, at Royals Stadium in Kansas City, Missouri

Game 4
Saturday, October 12, 1985, at Royals Stadium in Kansas City, Missouri

Game 5
Sunday, October 13, 1985, at Royals Stadium in Kansas City, Missouri

Game 6
Tuesday, October 15, 1985, at Exhibition Stadium in Toronto, Ontario

Game 7
Wednesday, October 16, 1985, at Exhibition Stadium in Toronto, Ontario

World Series

With the St. Louis Cardinals defeating the Los Angeles Dodgers in six games in the National League Championship Series, the 1985 World Series was destined to become one of the most memorable series for the cross-state rivals.  It was popularly known as the Show-Me Series (Missouri is "the Show-Me State") and the I-70 Series.  The 1985 World Series was played by National League rules, with no designated hitter, so the Royals were without the regular services of one of their best players, Hal McRae.

As they had done in the ALCS, the Royals lost three of their first four games with the Cardinals.  The key game in the Royals' comeback was Game 6, a game famous for a tremendous Kansas City comeback, unfortunately belittled in St. Louis as due to supposed umpire errors.   A  call in the 4th inning cost the Royals their closest scoring opportunity when Frank White was called out after stealing second, and appearing on replay to have been safe, and the next batter, Pat Sheridan, got a hit.  Facing elimination, the Royals trailed 1–0 in the bottom of the ninth inning before rallying to score two runs and win.  In what has been called "one of the most controversial and famous plays in Series history", Jorge Orta led off the bottom of the ninth with a ground ball to Cardinal first baseman Jack Clark, who flipped the ball to pitcher Todd Worrell covering first.  First base umpire Don Denkinger called Orta safe, but television replays  showed that Worrell had beaten him to the base.  Orta was later put out on the basepaths (the only out recorded in the inning), but Kansas City would go on to win as the Cardinals unravelled with a dropped pop up, a passed ball and poor pitching as the Royals capitalized on the opportunity.  The Cardinals became  completely undone in Game 7.  The Royals' Bret Saberhagen pitched a five-hit shutout, allowing the Royals to win 11–0 and clinch the franchise's first World Series title as the Cardinals' pitchers fell apart.
AL Kansas City Royals (4) vs NL St. Louis Cardinals (3)

Free agents
After the season these players became free agents:
 Dane Iorg, signed with the San Diego Padres
 Lynn Jones, re-signed
 Hal McRae, re-signed
 Jamie Quirk, re-signed

Player stats

Batting

Starters by position
Note: Pos = Position; G = Games played; AB = At bats; R = Runs; H = Hits; Avg. = Batting average; HR = Home runs; RBI = Runs batted in; SB = Stolen bases

Other batters
Note: G = Games played; AB = At bats; R = Runs; H = Hits; HR = Home runs; RBI = Runs batted in; Avg. = Batting average; SB = Stolen bases

Pitching

Starting pitchers
Note: G = Games pitched; GS = Games started; IP = Innings pitched; W = Wins; L = Losses; ERA = Earned run average; SO = Strikeouts; BB = Walks allowed

Other pitchers
Note: G = Games pitched; IP = Innings pitched; W = Wins; L = Losses; SV = Saves; ERA = Earned run average; SO = Strikeouts

Relief pitchers
Note: G = Games pitched; GS = Games started; W = Wins; L = Losses; SV = Saves; ERA = Earned run average; SO = Strikeouts

Awards and honors
Cy Young Award  Bret Saberhagen
Rolaids Relief Man of the Year Award  Dan Quisenberry
ALCS MVP  George Brett
Gold Glove Award  Third base—George Brett
Silver Slugger Award  Third base—George Brett
Executive of the Year  General Manager John Schuerholz

Records and milestones

Batting
Triples
 Willie Wilson set the Royals single season record with 21 triples.

Home runs
 Steve Balboni set the Royals single season record with 36 home runs.

Strikeouts
 Steve Balboni set the Royals single season record with 166 strikeouts.

Pitching
Games pitched
 Dan Quisenberry set the Royals single season record with 84 games pitched and finished the season with 444 on the all-time Royals list, passing Paul Splittorff (with 429) for first place.

Saves
 Dan Quisenberry, first on the all-time Royals list, finishes the season with 217.

Farm system 

LEAGUE CHAMPIONS: Fort Myers

References
 
 1985 Kansas City Royals at Baseball Almanac
 

Notes:

Kansas City Royals seasons
Kansas City Royals
American League West champion seasons
American League champion seasons
World Series champion seasons
Kansas City